Bow River, a partly perennial stream of the Hunter River catchment, is located in the Hunter district of New South Wales, Australia.

Course
Bow River rises below Galla Gilla Mountain and is formed by the confluence of Bobialla Creek and Spring Creek, near the village of Bow, west of Merriwa, and flows generally south southwest, southeast, and south, joined by three minor tributaries, before reaching its confluence with the Goulburn River within Goulburn River National Park, west of Denman. Bow River descends  over its  course.

See also

 List of rivers of Australia
 List of rivers of New South Wales (A–K)
 Rivers of New South Wales

References

External links
 

 

Rivers of the Hunter Region
Upper Hunter Shire